A domain is the targeted subject area of a computer program. It is a term used in software engineering. Formally it represents the target subject of a specific programming project, whether narrowly or broadly defined. For example, a particular programming project might have had as a goal, the creation of a program for a particular hospital, and that hospital would be the domain. Or the project could be expanded in scope to include all hospitals as their domain. In a computer programming design, you define a domain by delineating a set of common requirements, terminology, and functionality for any software program constructed to solve a problem in the area of computer programming, known as domain engineering. The word domain is also taken as a synonym of application domain.

Domain in the realm of software engineering commonly refers to the subject area on which the application is intended to apply. In other words, during application development, the domain is the "sphere of knowledge and activity around which the application logic revolves." —Andrew Powell-Morse

Domain: A sphere of knowledge, influence, or activity. The subject area to which the user applies a program is the domain of the software. —Eric Evans

See also
 Domain-driven design
 Domain-specific programming language
 Domain model
 Programming domain

References

Software design